One, Two is a 1982 album by Sister Nancy. Originally issued on vinyl, it was reissued on compact disc in 1992.

Track listing 
"One Two"
"I Am A Geddion"
"Aint No Stopping Nancy"
"Gwan A School"
"Coward Of The Country"
"Bam Bam"
"Transport Connection"
"Pegion Rock"
"Roof Over Mi Head"
"Only Woman DJ With Degree"

Personnel
Errol "Flabba" Holt, Robbie Shakespeare - bass
Carlton "Santa" Davis, Sly Dunbar, Lincoln "Style" Scott - drums
Ansel Collins, Wycliffe "Steale" Johnson, Winston Wright - keyboards
Marvin Brooks, Skully, Christopher "Sky Juice" Blake - percussion
Bobby Ellis, Dean Frazer, Ronald "Namboo" Robinson - horns

References

1982 albums
Sister Nancy albums